Fear of Tomorrow is the debut album by Danish thrash metal band Artillery. It was released in 1985 via Neat Records.

Track listing

Personnel 
Flemming Rönsdorf – vocals
Michael Stützer – lead guitars
Jørgen Sandau – rhythm guitars
Morten Stützer – bass
Carsten Nielsen – drums

1985 debut albums
Artillery (band) albums